Nelisiwe Mildred Oliphant was South Africa's Minister of Labour from October 2010 to May 2019.

References

Year of birth missing (living people)
Living people
Labor ministers
Government ministers of South Africa
Women government ministers of South Africa